Tregaye Fraser (born September 6, 1984) is an American chef.

Professional History

She trained at Le Cordon Bleu

Fraser was the winner of the twelfth season of the Food Network television series Food Network Star. She also has previously made appearances as a winner on Cutthroat Kitchen and Guy's Grocery Games, Steve Harvey, Good Morning America.

In January 2017, Fraser became a regular co-host of the second season of Kitchen Sink, which lasted three episodes before it was removed from the Food Network schedule.

As of January 2021, Fraser started a new series called Tregaye's Way in the Kitchen. The series is produced by OWN and is on Discovery+. She was previously a host of  Food Network's “Cakealikes“.

References

External links

 

1984 births
African-American chefs
Chefs from Georgia (U.S. state)
American television chefs
Food Network chefs
Food Network Star winners
Living people
Television personalities from Atlanta
American women chefs
21st-century African-American people
21st-century African-American women
20th-century African-American people
20th-century African-American women